Maurice Owen (4 July 1924 – 8 July 2000) was an English professional footballer who scored 150 goals in 555 appearances in the Football League playing for Swindon Town.

Early life
Born in Abingdon, Oxfordshire, Owen served as a Chindit in Burma during the latter years of World War II. He returned to Abingdon following the war, working as an apprentice in the MG factory in the town.

Career
Owen joined Swindon from non-league side Abingdon Town in December 1946. He started his Swindon career in impressive goal scoring form, scoring sixteen times in seventeen matches during his first season, including a hattrick on his debut against Watford and a four-goal haul during a match against Mansfield Town. During his career, Swindon twice agreed a fee to sell Owen to other clubs, £14,000 to Norwich City in 1951 and £7,500 to Bristol City in 1955, but Owen rejected both moves, not wanting to move away from his home in Abingdon. There were also unsuccessful approaches from Portsmouth and Wolverhampton Wanderers. After his retirement, Owen commented on his refusal to move away from Swindon, stating:

"I would have liked to play in the First Division, I suppose, but not enough to make me move. To be honest, I was so happy at Swindon. They were a good club and I was among good friends. It was a joy to go to the County Ground every day."

Having started his career as a centre forward, he later moved back into defence. In all competitions he scored 164 goals from 601 appearances for the club. After he finished playing he joined Swindon's backroom staff, serving as a coach before working as a groundsman.

Later life
Owen was married to his wife Marjorie for nearly 50 years. In his later years, he suffered with Alzheimer's disease for more than a decade and suffered a stroke in 1998. Still living in his hometown Abingdon, Oxfordshire, he died in 2000 at the age of 76.

Career statistics
Source:

References

External links
 Article from Swindon Advertiser

1924 births
2000 deaths
People from Abingdon-on-Thames
English footballers
Association football forwards
Association football defenders
Abingdon Town F.C. players
Swindon Town F.C. players
English Football League players
Indian Army personnel of World War II